Bağlarbaşı (literally "head of the gardens") is a Turkish place name that may refer to the following places in Turkey:

 Bağlarbaşı, Gölbaşı, a village in the district of Gölbaşı, Adıyaman Province
 Bağlarbaşı, Çine, a village in the district of Çine, Aydın Province
 Bağlarbaşı, Üsküdar, a neighborhood of Üsküdar, Istanbul
 Bağlarbaşı (Istanbul Metro), a railway station